Gomal University (Urdu: جامعہ گومل), is a public research university located in Dera Ismail Khan in the Khyber-Pakhtunkhwa province of Pakistan. Founded and established in 1974, the university is one of the oldest institutions in the country and occupies one of the largest campuses in the Khyber-Pakhtunkhwa province.

Gomal University is one of the reputable universities in Pakistan offering a wide range of courses both at undergraduate, postgraduate, and doctoral levels besides research degree programs in most of the departments. It consisted of four faculties of science, with a strong emphasis on natural and medical sciences courses. Gomal University is affiliated with the Higher Education Commission and the National Testing Service.

The university was founded by Prime Minister Zulfikar Ali Bhutto, and the donation came from Allah Nawaz Khan, who donated a large area of his land to the establishment of the university. Allah Nawaz Khan was also Gomal University's first vice-chancellor in 1974.

Dr. Iftikhar Ahmad is the current vice-chancellor.

History

Gomal University was established as a chartered and co-educational university. The university is the 12th oldest university in terms of HEC's seniority listings. The university was founded by Prime Minister Zulfikar Ali Bhutto who laid the establishment of Gomal University in D.I.Khan, Khyber-Pakhtunkhwa Province. Prime Minister Bhutto laid down the foundation stone of Gomal University on 1 May 1974 putting forward his educational policy of highly educated Pakistan to meet the challenges of the modern world in every aspect of life. Notably, the donations and land were provided by Nawab Allah Nawaz Khan who served as the university's first and founding vice-chancellor. Nawaz Khan donated 11000 Kn agricultural land to the establishment of the university.

The Act No. X of 1974 provides the constitutional establishment of the university as a public research university categorization of the Ministry of Education. The post-graduate schools of Physics, Mathematics, Chemistry, States, and Economics were founded in 1974. The business school and the school of mass communication were founded in 1974 as well. In 1975, the Department of Pharmacy started its classes. The faculty of agriculture was established and began its classes in December 1979.

Academics

Institute of Engineering and Technology
The Institute of Engineering and Technology of Gomal University grants Bachelor of Science degrees in tele-systems, electronics, and telecommunications engineering disciplines. The school also awards a Master of Science degree in Telecommunications Network. Gomal University also grants undergraduate degrees in law. The institute also awards bachelor's degrees in the following disciplines:
 Bachelor of Science
Computer Science
Information Technology
Electronics Engineering
Telecommunications Engineering
Biotechnology

In 2003, Abdul Qadeer Khan helped the university financially in building an auditorium that was named after him.

Gomal University Law College

The Law College is one of the constituent colleges of Gomal University dedicated to the promotion of legal education. The Law College grants the LLB degree and it consisted of 11 registered faculty members in the Law college.

Gomal College of Veterinary Sciences

The Gomal College of Veterinary Sciences was established as the Institute of Animal Husbandry and Veterinary Sciences. The college grants Master of Philosophy and Doctor of Veterinary Medicine academic degrees. The college is under the jurisprudence of the Ministry of Food Agriculture and Livestock.

Graduate schools and departments

The university offers master programmes in physics, chemistry, mathematics, economics, and biological science. The research on physics began in 1974 after the physics department gained independence from Peshawar University the following year. Earlier, the Physics Department was established in the Government Post-Graduate College (GPGC) under the University of Peshawar in 1968 and was transferred to Gomal University in 1974. During the same time, scientist Abdul Qadeer Khan joined the research faculty and briefly taught courses on physics as a visiting professor. Gomal University currently focuses its research and development in radiation physics, particle physics, plasma physics, and computational physics (as well as Monte Carlo integration).

Degrees offered 
Gomal University offers the following degrees:

Bachelors 
 Bachelor of Computer Science
 Bachelor in Information Technology
 Bachelor of Science (Telecommunication Engineering)
 Bachelor of Business Administration
 Bachelor of Commerce (Hons)
 Bachelor of Education
 Pharm.D
 Doctor of Veterinary Medicine
 Bachelor of Science (Biotechnology)

Postgraduate 
 Master of Science in Journalism and Mass Communication
 Master of Computer Science
 Master of Science in Health and Physical Education
 Master of Science in Biology
 Master of Science in Chemistry( world )
 Master of Science in Economics
 Master of Science in Mathematics
 Master of Science in Physics
 Master of Science in Statistics
 Master of Arts in Islamic Studies
 Master of Business Administration
 Master of Arts in Pak Studies
 Master of Business Administration (Banking & Finance) 
 Master of Commerce
 Master of Education
 Master of Arts (English)
 Master in Public Administration
 Master in Public Health
 LLB

References

External links
Gomal University

Universities and colleges in Khyber Pakhtunkhwa
Dera Ismail Khan District
Engineering universities and colleges in Pakistan
Business schools in Pakistan
Pharmacy schools in Pakistan
Law schools in Pakistan
Computer science institutes in Pakistan
Medical colleges in Pakistan
Public universities and colleges in Pakistan